Bangladesh Mahila Samiti Girls' High School & College is a school for girls, located in Kotwali Thana of Chittagong, Bangladesh. For short it is known as 'BMS' (Bangladesh Mahila Samiti) or 'BWA' (Bangladesh Women's  Association) Girls' High School & College. The school was established in 1962 (then East Pakistan, pre-independence Bangladesh). It was formerly known as Bangladesh Women Association Institute and was a coeducational school in its early years. It has been securing the top places among all the institutions of the Board since its establishment in 1962 and it has also been named as one of the best and most reputable Girls' School in the Board. In 2013, it placed third among schools within Chittagong Division in student performance on the Junior School Certificate (JSC) examinations.

Notable alumni
Wasfia Nazreen, Bangladeshi mountaineer, activist, social worker and writer. She is the first Bangladeshi and first Bengali to complete the Seven Summits.

References

Schools in Chittagong
Educational institutions established in 1962
Girls' schools in Bangladesh
1962 establishments in East Pakistan